A seaplane base is a type of airport that is located in a body of water, usually a river, bay, harbor, or lake, where seaplanes and amphibious aircraft take-off and land.

History
Initially following the invention of the seaplane, traditional boat docks were typically used as there was little need for purpose-built facilities. This would later change, however, as commercial seaplane operations proved financially viable, leading many companies, most notably Pan American Airways, to push for the construction of seaplane bases that were optimized for such use. These new seaplane bases often featured terminal buildings for passengers and cargo, concrete ramps for amphibious aircraft, and floating docks that connected to land. Seaplane bases would end up becoming very heavily utilized for commercial air traffic for a number of years, but they eventually fell out of favor as land based aircraft rose in prominence. Advances in aircraft technology following World War II resulted in the development of land based aircraft that were capable of travelling greater distances, thus relegating seaplane bases to secondary use by about the 1950s. Although their commercial use has generally fallen out of the mainstream, many seaplane bases in remote areas still have commercial service as a means of providing easier access. Other bases still exist for general aviation use as well.

References

Aerodromes